Vargah Vir (also Romanized as Vargah Vīr; also known as Vargah Vīrā) is a village in Shalyar Rural District, Uraman District, Sarvabad County, Kurdistan Province, Iran. At the 2006 census, its population was 24, in 6 families. The village is populated by Kurds.

References 

Towns and villages in Sarvabad County
Kurdish settlements in Kurdistan Province